Manuel Peter Neuer (born 27 March 1986) is a German professional footballer who plays as a goalkeeper and captains both  club Bayern Munich and the Germany national team. Widely regarded as one of the greatest goalkeepers of all time, Neuer has been described as a "sweeper-keeper" because of his playing style and speed when rushing off his line to anticipate opponents, going out of the penalty area. He was named the best goalkeeper of the decade from 2011 to 2020 by IFFHS.

Neuer started his career at Schalke 04 where he won the DFB-Pokal and DFL-Ligapokal. In 2011, he signed for Bayern Munich and has since won 28 trophies, including ten Bundesliga titles and two UEFA Champions League titles in 2013 and 2020, both as part of trebles. In 2014, Neuer finished third in the voting for the FIFA Ballon d'Or award behind Lionel Messi and Cristiano Ronaldo. He was awarded the UEFA Goalkeeper of the Year and the IFFHS World's Best Goalkeeper five times each.

Neuer was selected as Germany's number one goalkeeper for the 2010 FIFA World Cup in South Africa. During the group stages, he only conceded a single goal. He provided the assist for Miroslav Klose's opening goal against England as Germany won 4–1. Four years later, Neuer won the 2014 FIFA World Cup with Germany as well as the Golden Glove award for being the best goalkeeper in the tournament.

Club career

Schalke 04 

Neuer played for Schalke 04 II during 2003–04, 2004–05, 2006–07, 2007–08 and 2008–09. Neuer progressed through every age group at his hometown club, Schalke 04, and signed professional terms in 2005. Neuer did not make any first team appearances during the 2005–06 season. However, he was on the bench several times and won the 2005 DFL-Ligapokal as an unused substitute.  He made his Bundesliga debut with Schalke when he came on as a substitute for the injured Frank Rost on matchday 2 of the 2006–07 season. The 20-year-old eventually won the starting position when Rost was surprisingly dropped for the clash against Bayern Munich. Neuer managed to secure a 2–2 draw against the defending champions. He made 27 league appearances during the 2006–07 season. Despite his young age, he was widely tipped to be a potential successor to his former idol Jens Lehmann in the future for the Germany national team.

Neuer started the 2007–08 season by playing in three matches in the German League Cup. On 5 March 2008, in the first knockout round of the UEFA Champions League against Porto, he almost single-handedly kept Schalke in the game with several saves, forcing the game into penalties. He then saved penalties from Bruno Alves and Lisandro López to help Schalke advance to the quarter-finals. He was shortlisted for the 2007–08 UEFA Club Goalkeeper of the Year award; he was the youngest as well as the only Bundesliga goalkeeper on the list. He was one of only three Bundesliga players to play every minute in the 2007–08 season. He finished the season by making 50 appearances in all competitions.

In the 2008–09 season, Schalke finished eighth in the league table and missed out on a Europa League spot. However, his showing at the 2009 UEFA European Under-21 Championship sparked interest from Bayern Munich, with Bayern chairman Karl-Heinz Rummenigge declaring interest in signing the young goalkeeper. Schalke's new manager Felix Magath, however, insisted that Neuer would play for Schalke in the next season. In November, he was the only German goalkeeper in the list of five nominated goalkeepers for the UEFA Team of the Year.

Neuer finished the 2009–10 season with 39 appearances.

For the 2010–11 season, Neuer was appointed captain and led the team to its first Champions League semi-final appearance to play against Manchester United. He also won the DFB-Pokal in his final season with the club, as Schalke defeated MSV Duisburg 5–0. On 20 April 2011, he announced that he would not be extending his contract with Schalke, which was set to expire at the end of the 2011–12 season. He received criticism from Schalke fans, who were disappointed with him leaving for a rival club. Neuer finished the season with 53 appearances.

Bayern Munich

2011–13: Transfer and treble winner

On 1 June 2011, Neuer made his move to Bayern Munich and signed a five-year contract that lasted until June 2016. Following initial hostility from Bayern fans towards Neuer, as some fans were unhappy about Bayern buying a Schalke keeper, a round-table discussion between Bayern and group of supporters' representatives took place on 2 July 2011. Among other things, it was decided that Neuer would be regarded as a full member of Bayern Munich, who should be treated with due respect. Furthermore, hostility towards him should cease. In the first weeks at Bayern, after a 0–0 draw with 1899 Hoffenheim, Neuer broke the Bayern Munich record for most competitive clean sheets in a row, having gone over 1,000 minutes without conceding, beating the record formerly held by Oliver Kahn.

On 25 April 2012, Neuer saved penalty kicks from both Cristiano Ronaldo and Kaká and helped Bayern through the 2011–12 Champions League semi-finals against Real Madrid. Following the match, Neuer revealed that he studied the way Ronaldo took his penalties. Neuer told Bild: "I always prepare myself for such situations. Our goalkeeping coach, Toni Tapalović, showed me on his laptop before the match how Ronaldo usually takes his penalties. I learned that Ronaldo prefers to send the ball low to his left. In the penalty shoot-out, I was convinced that he would aim for his favourite spot."

Bayern went on to progress to the 2012 UEFA Champions League Final against Chelsea, which also went to a penalty shoot-out after a 1–1 draw. Neuer took and scored the third penalty for Bayern and also saved the first penalty taken by Juan Mata, but could not save the rest of the penalties as Munich lost the trophy 4–3 on penalties in their home stadium, the Allianz Arena. Neuer finished the season with 53 appearances.

Neuer started the season by winning the 2012 DFL-Supercup. In the 2012–13 UEFA Champions League knockout phase, Neuer posted four clean sheets in a row versus both Juventus and Barcelona. In the 2013 Champions League Final against Borussia Dortmund, Neuer posted eight saves en route to Bayern's fifth Champions League title. The game featured several saves from both keepers, and Neuer won the duel against Roman Weidenfeller having only conceded once to İlkay Gündoğan on a penalty shot. Neuer finished the season with 31 Bundesliga appearances, five German Cup appearances, 13 UEFA Champions League appearances, and a German Super Cup appearance.

2013–16: Ballon d'Or nomination, domestic success
Neuer started the season by losing in the 2013 DFL-Supercup to Borussia Dortmund. For the 2013 UEFA Super Cup, on 30 August 2013, he saved the last and decisive penalty which saw Bayern Munich win the match against Chelsea, taking some revenge for the lost 2012 UEFA Champions League final. In the FIFA Club World Cup, Neuer played against Guangzhou Evergrande in the semi-final and Raja Casablanca in the final. Neuer was announced as the 2013 World Goalkeeper of The Year on 7 January 2014. On 9 February, Bayern faced Arsenal in the Champions League knockout phase and Neuer saved the penalty from Mesut Özil in the first half. Bayern went on to win the game 2–0 away. On 2 May 2014, Neuer extended his contract until the summer of 2019. Neuer finished the season with 31 Bundesliga appearances, five German Cup appearances, 12 UEFA Champions League appearances, one German Super Cup appearance, one UEFA Super Cup appearance, and two FIFA Club World Cup appearances for a total of 52 appearances.

Neuer won the Footballer of the Year (Germany) prize, was voted into the UEFA Team of the Year, and finished third in the FIFA Ballon d'Or. Neuer started the season by losing the 2014 DFL-Supercup to Borussia Dortmund. On 30 January 2015, Neuer started on matchday 18, where Bayern lost to VfL Wolfsburg 4–1. This was the first league match since joining Bayern in 2011 where he had given up four goals in a match. The last time Bayern had conceded four goals in a match was against Wolfsburg on 4 April 2009. On 28 April 2015, Neuer was one of four Bayern players to miss in a 2–0 penalty shootout defeat to Borussia Dortmund in the DFB-Pokal semi-final. Neuer finished the season with 32 Bundesliga appearances, five German Cup appearances, 12 UEFA Champions League appearances, and one German Super Cup appearance for a total of 50 appearances.

The  2015-16 season started when Neuer started in the 1–1 draw against VfL Wolfsburg in the 2015 DFL-Supercup. Wolfsburg won the subsequent shootout. On 20 April 2016, Neuer extended his contract with Bayern until 2021. Neuer finished the season with 34 Bundesliga appearances, five German Cup appearances, 11 UEFA Champions League appearances, and one German Supercup Cup appearance for a total of 51 appearances.

2016–20: Club captain and second treble
Neuer's season began with a 2–0 win over Borussia Dortmund at the 2016 DFL-Supercup as FC Bayern won the title for the first time in three years, and he kept a clean sheet in the Bundesliga opener as FC Bayern grabbed a 6–0 win over Werder Bremen. In January 2017, he was voted into the FIFA Team of the Year alongside fellow German and former Bayern teammate Toni Kroos. Neuer conceded twice in FC Bayern's matches against Arsenal as the Bavarians beat the English team with an impressive 10–2 aggregate in the round of 16 of the 2016–17 UEFA Champions League. Neuer was then praised for his performance in their first game of the quarterfinals against Real Madrid, although Bayern lost 1–2 to the Spanish club. During the second leg, he suffered a left foot fracture that ended his season abruptly as Bayern lost 4–2 in a controversial match. Bayern ended the season as Bundesliga champions. In addition to playing in the DFL-Supercup, Neuer played in 26 Bundesliga matches, four German Cup matches, and nine Champions League matches.

On 19 July 2017, it was announced that Neuer would become the new captain for both Bayern and the Germany national team following Philipp Lahm's retirement. Neuer played his first game of the season on Bundesliga matchday 2 after recovering from a foot injury that occurred in April during a Champions League game versus Real Madrid. On 13 September 2017, Neuer made his 100th European appearance in a Champions League match as his side won 3–0 over Anderlecht. It was announced in September that Neuer would be ruled out until January 2018 after another fracture to the same foot again. After series of delays on his comeback, he finally rejoined team training with Bayern Munich on 20 April 2018 after seven months away, although he had begun goalkeeping-specific training in early April. Neuer was included in the matchday squad for the first time since his injury in the DFB-Pokal final against Eintracht Frankfurt but he was an unused substitute. Neuer finished the season with three Bundesliga matches and a Champions League match.

On 12 August 2018, Neuer captained his side in the first competitive match of the season as Bayern won the 2018 DFL-Supercup by defeating Eintracht Frankfurt with a 5–0 victory. On 24 August, Neuer played his first Bundesliga game in 341 days when he captained Bayern in a 3–1 victory season opener against Hoffenheim. On 14 April 2019, Neuer sustained a torn muscle fibres in his left calf in a Bundesliga match against Fortuna Düsseldorf. Due to the injury, Neuer missed six matches for Bayern in the closing stages of the season.

On 18 May 2019, Neuer won his seventh consecutive Bundesliga title as Bayern finished two points above Dortmund. A week later, Neuer returned from injury and won his fifth DFB-Pokal as Bayern defeated RB Leipzig 3–0 in the 2019 DFB-Pokal Final. Neuer finished the season with 26 Bundesliga matches, 3 German Cup matches and 8 Champions League matches. Neuer's 2019–20 started with a 2–0 loss to Borussia Dortmund in the German Super Cup on 3 August 2019. On 21 May 2020, Neuer signed a new contract with Bayern, keeping him at the club until 2023. On 23 August, Neuer won the Champions League for the second time, his first as Bayern captain, keeping a clean sheet as his team won 1–0 over PSG. He was widely praised for his performance. He finished the season with 33 Bundesliga appearances, six German Cup appearances, and 11 UEFA Champions League appearances.

2020–23: The Sextuple and new records
On 24 September 2020, Neuer saved a one-on-one chance from Sevilla's Youssef En-Nesyri in the 87th minute in the 2020 UEFA Super Cup, which Bayern Munich won 2–1 after extra-time. Six days later, Neuer won the German Super Cup. On 21 October 2020, Neuer reached his 200th clean sheet with Bayern in 394 matches in a 4–0 win over Atlético Madrid in the 2020–21 UEFA Champions League. His record surpassed Sepp Maier (199 clean sheets in 651 games), with only Oliver Kahn (247 clean sheets in 632 matches) ahead of Neuer. On 28 August 2021, Neuer had his 205th clean sheet in Bundesliga in 441 matches, breaking Oliver Kahn's record of 204 clean sheets in 557 matches.

Neuer's 300th Bundesliga victory came in his 447th Bundesliga game on 23 October 2021. Bayern won the Bundesliga during the 2021–22 season with three games to spare. After the season, Neuer extended his contract with Bayern Munich until 2024. In the beginning of the 2022–23 season, he kept clean sheets in all his three matches in the Champions League, and four in 12 Bundesliga appearances. On 10 December 2022, Neuer announced that he broke his leg during a ski trip at Roßkopf on Spitzingsee in Bavaria, which would force him to miss the rest of the season.

International career

Youth 
After progressing through the youth teams, Neuer made his Germany under-21 debut on 15 August 2006 against the Netherlands. He won the 2009 UEFA European Under-21 Championship with Germany in Sweden and kept a clean sheet in the 4–0 win in the final against England.

2010 World Cup 
Neuer was called up on 19 May 2009 to the senior German squad for a tour of Asia. He made his debut on this tour in a match against the United Arab Emirates on 2 June. He played in the November friendly against the Ivory Coast that ended 2–2. Although he took responsibility for the first goal conceded, manager Joachim Löw refused to blame him and instead commended him for doing his best.

The death of keeper Robert Enke in November 2009 saw him elevated to second choice goalkeeper behind René Adler. Adler, however, suffered a serious rib injury which ruled him out of the upcoming 2010 World Cup; Neuer became Germany's first choice goalkeeper ahead of Tim Wiese and Hans-Jörg Butt for the tournament.

Neuer was selected as Germany's number one goalkeeper for the 2010 World Cup in South Africa. During the group stages, he only conceded a single goal, a close range shot by Milan Jovanović in the match against Serbia. He provided the assist for Miroslav Klose's opening goal against England, winning 4–1. In the same match, England's Frank Lampard had a goal disallowed after his shot hit the crossbar and bounced past the goal line. Controversially, Neuer admitted that he knew it was a legitimate goal, but acted in a way to make the referee doubt this. He played in all of Germany's World Cup matches apart from the third-place game against Uruguay, when Hans-Jörg Butt was rewarded with a spot in the starting lineup.

Euro 2012 

Neuer played every minute of every match in the qualification campaign for UEFA Euro 2012, helping Germany to secure ten wins out of ten games and top their group. After Germany's 3–1 away win against Turkey, he was especially praised for his "sensational" performance. He retained a close range volley shot by Hamit Altıntop, and then he quickly threw the ball to the halfway line into the feet of Thomas Müller, who immediately provided the assist for Mario Gómez's opening goal. Neuer then set up the second goal; under pressure by Turkish attackers, he fired a precise long range kick to Mario Götze deep in the opponent's half, who then found Müller on the edge of the opponent's penalty box to score. Neuer started all three of Germany's matches in the oft-dubbed "Group of Death", Group B. He kept a clean sheet against Portugal while also conceding one goal each to the Netherlands and Denmark. Germany went on to win Group B; they were the only team in the tournament to win all of their group stage games. He finished group play posting two saves against Portugal, three against the Netherlands and three again against Denmark.

2014 World Cup 

Neuer's "sweeper-keeper" playing style distinguished him from other starting goalkeepers in the 2014 World Cup. This was credited with allowing his teammates to press deep in their opponents' half; in addition, Neuer's willingness to come out and challenge opposing attackers caused them to miss shots. Neuer's outfield roaming, which had made him the team's "11th man", has been attributed to the coaching he received from Bayern Munich manager Pep Guardiola.

After keeping clean sheets in group matches against Portugal and the United States, Neuer had an outstanding performance in a 2–1 win against Algeria after extra time in the round of 16, when he had to play as a sweeper-keeper to defend their counter-attacks. He recorded his third clean sheet of the World Cup in the 1–0 quarter-final defeat of France. This was his 22nd clean sheet overall in his 50th appearance for die Nationalmannschaft. In the semi-finals, Neuer conceded a late goal as his team routed hosts Brazil 7–1.

On 13 July, in the FIFA World Cup Final against Argentina, Neuer was not heavily tested, but he nonetheless commanded his penalty area well, challenging attacking runs by Gonzalo Higuaín and Rodrigo Palacio that caused them to shoot wide of the net. Early in the second half, Neuer punched the ball clear before colliding with Higuaín at the edge of the box. Argentina finished the match without a shot on goal, despite several good chances, including a Higuaín goal disallowed for offside. Germany ultimately defeated Argentina 1–0 thanks to a Mario Götze goal in extra time. Neuer won the Golden Glove award for the tournament's best goalkeeper. Neuer also finished the tournament with 244 completed passes, more than outfield players like Lionel Messi (242), Wesley Sneijder (242), and Thomas Müller (221).

Euro 2016 
On 31 May 2016, Neuer was selected for Germany's final 23 man squad for UEFA Euro 2016. During the tournament, Neuer did not concede any goals during Germany's three group games against Ukraine, Poland and Northern Ireland. He also kept a clean sheet in the round of 16 against Slovakia. During the quarter-finals, on 2 July 2016, he finally conceded a goal against Italy from a Leonardo Bonucci penalty kick; Neuer established a new record by not conceding a goal in a major tournament for 557 minutes. The previous record-holder was his compatriot Sepp Maier, who did not concede a goal for 481 minutes. A 1–1 draw after extra-time saw the match go to a penalty shoot-out, in which Neuer helped Germany to a 6–5 victory by saving two spot kicks, including one from Bonucci. Neuer was named Man of the Match for his performance.

2018 World Cup 
Prior to the start of qualification, on 1 September 2016, Neuer was named new captain of the national team, following Bastian Schweinsteiger's retirement from international football. On 15 May 2018, Neuer was selected in Germany's 27-man preliminary squad for the 2018 FIFA World Cup even though he had not played a match since fracturing his foot for a second time in September 2017. Neuer made his first appearance since his injury on 2 June, in a 2–1 friendly defeat to Austria in Klagenfurt. On 4 June, Neuer was selected in the final 23-man squad for the World Cup. On 17 June, Neuer captained his side for the first time in the World Cup in their opening match in which they lost 1–0 to Mexico. On 23 June, Neuer made several saves as his side defeated Sweden with a 2–1 victory in their second group stage match, which kept the Germans from being knocked out of the World Cup. However, his side were knocked out of the tournament after losing 2–0 to South Korea in their last group stage match.

Euro 2020 
On 11 June 2019, in Germany's UEFA Euro 2020 qualifying 8–0 victory over Estonia, Neuer kept the 37th clean sheet of his international career, breaking a record set by Sepp Maier. On 19 May 2021, Neuer was selected for the squad for the UEFA Euro 2020.

On 7 June 2021, he achieved his 100th cap with the national team in a friendly match against Latvia, becoming the first German goalkeeper to reach that milestone.

UEFA began investigating Neuer for wearing rainbow-coloured captain's armband at the Euros to commemorate Pride month. They later confirmed it did not breach tournament rules against making on-field political statements.

2022 World Cup 
Neuer was called up to Germany's squad for the 2022 World Cup in Qatar. Hence, he became the first German goalkeeper to feature in four consecutive World Cups. On 1 December, he made his 19th World Cup appearance, breaking the previous record for goalkeepers, including both Sepp Maier and Brazil's Cláudio Taffarel of 18 appearances. Despite a 4–2 win over Costa Rica in the last group stage match, Germany was eliminated from the same round for the second World Cup in a row as they finished third in their group on goal difference after Japan pulled an upset 2–1 win over Spain.

Style of play 

Considered by some in the media to be the current best goalkeeper in the world, and one of the greatest goalkeepers both of his generation and of all time, Neuer is widely regarded as a "complete" and modern goalkeeper. He is regarded by some pundits to be the best goalkeeper of the modern era, with Peter Staunton of Goal.com labelling him as "the best goalkeeper since Yashin," who is currently the only goalkeeper ever to have won the Ballon d'Or.

A tall, large, athletic, and physically strong player, Neuer has earned critical acclaim from former players and pundits for his speed, stamina, composure, concentration, consistency, and mentality, as well as for being able to adapt to any given situation on the pitch. He is particularly known for his exceptional reflexes, shot-stopping abilities (with both his arms and legs), agility, speed, and footwork, as well as his handling, capacity to read the game, and ability to come out to collect crosses, which enables him to command his area effectively. When the situation demands, he will also often essentially fill the role of a sweeper when opposing players have beaten the offside trap or his team's defensive line by quickly rushing out of goal to anticipate opponents and clear the ball; his skill, speed and decision-making in this area enables his teams to maintain a high defensive line. Because of his unique playing style, Neuer has been described as a "sweeper-keeper", and has been credited with revolutionising the role of the goalkeeper in modern times. He has also been praised by pundits for his positioning between the posts, as well as his ability in one-on-one situations; furthermore, he is effective at stopping penalties, and has also been known to take and score them in shoot-outs.

A former outfield player in his youth, in addition to his goalkeeping ability, Neuer has also been praised for his excellent ball control and for his accurate distribution of the ball with both his hands and feet; his long throwing range and ability to kick the ball into deep areas with either foot enables him to play the ball out on the ground or create plays or launch swift counter-attacks from the back. Regarding his technical skills on the ball in comparison to other players in his role, Neuer has stated that he could play in the German third division as a centre-back if so desired. Due to his authoritative leadership and vocal presence in goal, he also excels at communicating with his defenders and organising his team's defensive line. In 2015, Gianluigi Buffon described Neuer as the best goalkeeper of his era in the air.

Despite the praise for his style of play and role in the development of the goalkeeper position in football, Neuer has also received criticism in the German media for his reflex-like objection to attacking moves in his box regardless of whether they violate rules or not. In particular, his tendency to instantaneously raise his arm to alert the referee has led to the creation of the German word Reklamierarm (roughly translated: arm of objection) in German media.

Personal life 
Neuer was born in Gelsenkirchen, North Rhine-Westphalia. He attended Gesamtschule Berger Feld, like many other footballers, such as Mesut Özil. His brother Marcel is currently a football referee in the Verbandsliga. He received his first football when he was two, and he had his first game on 3 March 1991, 24 days before his fifth birthday. Neuer's hero and idol as a child was fellow German and former Schalke goalkeeper Jens Lehmann.

Neuer is Catholic, and lends his support to a Gelsenkirchen-based Catholic social action group which campaigns against child poverty and a Gelsenkirchen-based youth club run by the Amigonians.

Neuer started a charity foundation for children, named the Manuel Neuer Kids Foundation. In November 2011, he won €500,000 for charity in a celebrity edition of Wer wird Millionär?, the German version of Who Wants to Be a Millionaire?

Neuer was in a relationship with Kathrin Gilch until 2014. In 2015, Neuer started a relationship with Nina Weiss. On 21 May 2017, Neuer and Weiss married in Tannheim, Austria, in a civil ceremony, which was followed by a church wedding in the Cathedral of Santissima della Madia in Monopoli, Italy, on 10 June. The couple separated in early 2020, and Neuer started dating Anika Bissel.

After an erroneous translation of his statement "it would be good if a professional football player came out because it would help others to do the same", a South American publication concluded that he was gay, which was taken up by many other media outlets and has since been widely believed in some Latin American countries. Mexico were fined for their fans' homophobic chants when Neuer had the ball during a World Cup match in 2018.

In November 2022, Neuer revealed that he had to undergo three surgeries on his face in order to treat skin cancer, which later urged him to work with Angelique Kerber to promote sun cream. In December 2022, Bayern Munich announced that he had suffered a fracture of his lower right leg while skiing and will not be able to play for the rest of the season.

Career statistics

Club

International

Honours 
Schalke 04
 DFB-Pokal: 2010–11
 DFL-Ligapokal: 2005

Bayern Munich
 Bundesliga: 2012–13, 2013–14, 2014–15, 2015–16, 2016–17, 2017–18, 2018–19, 2019–20, 2020–21, 2021–22
 DFB-Pokal: 2012–13, 2013–14, 2015–16, 2018–19, 2019–20
 DFL-Supercup: 2012, 2016, 2018, 2020, 2021, 2022
 UEFA Champions League: 2012–13, 2019–20
 UEFA Super Cup: 2013, 2020
 FIFA Club World Cup: 2013, 2020

Germany U21
 UEFA European Under-21 Championship: 2009

Germany
 FIFA World Cup: 2014; third place: 2010

Individual
 Fritz Walter Medal U19 Silver: 2005
 kicker Goalkeeper of the Year: 2006–2007, 2010–11, 2013–14, 2014–15, 2015–16, 2016–17, 2019–20, 2020–21, 2021–22
 Footballer of the Year in Germany: 2011, 2014
 Germany national team Player of the Year: 2020
 ESM Team of the Season: 2011–12, 2012–13, 2014–15 
 UEFA European Championship Team of the Tournament: 2012 
 UEFA European Under-21 Championship All-time Dream Team
 IFFHS World's Best Goalkeeper: 2013, 2014, 2015, 2016, 2020
IFFHS World's Best Goalkeeper of the Decade: 2011–2020
 Best European Goalkeeper: 2011, 2013, 2014, 2015, 2020
 IFFHS Men's World Team: 2020
 FIFA FIFPro World 11: 2013, 2014 2015, 2016
 UEFA Team of the Year: 2013, 2014, 2015, 2020
 UEFA Champions League Final Fan's Man of the Match: 2013
 UEFA Champions League Squad of the Season: 2013–14, 2015–16, 2019–20
 UEFA Champions League Goalkeeper of the Season: 2019–20
 The Best FIFA Men's Goalkeeper: 2020
FIFA World Cup All-Star Team: 2010
 FIFA World Cup Golden Glove: 2014
 FIFA World Cup All-Star Team: 2014
 FIFA World Cup Dream Team: 2014
 AIPS Athlete of the Year: 2014
 AIPS Europe Athlete of the Year – Frank Taylor Trophy: 2014
 Bundesliga Team of the Season: 2012–13, 2013–14, 2014–15, 2015–16, 2016–17, 2020–21, 2021–22
 kicker Bundesliga Team of the Season: 2010–11, 2019–20, 2020–2021
Ballon d'Or Dream Team (Silver): 2020
 IFFHS World Team of the Decade: 2011–2020
 IFFHS UEFA Team of the Decade: 2011–2020

Orders
  Silbernes Lorbeerblatt: 2010, 2014
  Order of Merit of North Rhine-Westphalia: 2019
  Bavarian Order of Merit: 2021

Notes

See also 
 List of footballers with 100 or more UEFA Champions League appearances
 List of men's footballers with 100 or more international caps

References

External links 

  
 Manuel Neuer at FC Bayern Munich
 
 
 
 
 
 
 
 

1986 births
Living people
Sportspeople from Gelsenkirchen
Footballers from North Rhine-Westphalia
German footballers
Germany youth international footballers
Germany under-21 international footballers
Germany international footballers
Association football goalkeepers
FC Schalke 04 players
FC Schalke 04 II players
FC Bayern Munich footballers
Regionalliga players
Oberliga (football) players
Bundesliga players
UEFA Champions League winning players
2010 FIFA World Cup players
UEFA Euro 2012 players
2014 FIFA World Cup players
UEFA Euro 2016 players
2018 FIFA World Cup players
UEFA Euro 2020 players
2022 FIFA World Cup players
FIFA World Cup-winning players
People educated at the Gesamtschule Berger Feld
German Roman Catholics
German LGBT rights activists
FIFA Century Club